Jefferson Davis (1808–1889), President of the Confederate States from 1861 to 1865.

Jefferson Davis may also refer to:

People
Jefferson C. Davis (1828–1879), American Civil War Union general, military commander in territorial Alaska, murderer of Gen. William "Bull" Nelson
Jefferson "Jeff" Davis, U.S. Senator for Arkansas from 1907 to 1913
Jefferson Davis "Jeff" Hughes, III (born 1952), Republican member of the Louisiana Supreme Court
Carl Panzram, a serial killer who used the alias Jefferson Davis

Places
Jefferson Davis County, Mississippi
Jefferson Davis Parish, Louisiana

Other uses
Jefferson Davis (comics), a fictional character in Marvel Comics and the father of Miles Morales / Spider-Man
Jefferson Davis (revenue cutter), which was in use in 1853–1862.
Jefferson Davis (privateer), a ship allied with the Confederate States Navy
Jefferson Davis Community College, a college in Brewton, Alabama
Jefferson Davis High School (Montgomery, Alabama)
Jefferson Davis Highway, a planned US transcontinental highway in the 1920s
Jefferson Davis Hospital, in Houston, Texas
Jefferson Davis Hotel, in Montgomery, Alabama
Jefferson Davis Presidential Library and Museum, in Biloxi, Mississippi
Jefferson Davis State Historic Site, a monument at Davis's birthplace in northern Kentucky
Jefferson Davis Memorial Historic Site, in Irwin County, Georgia, marks the location where he was captured in 1865
List of memorials to Jefferson Davis, several statues and other memorials to the Confederate president
Northside High School (Houston), formerly named Jefferson Davis High School

See also
Boss Hogg or Jefferson Davis Hogg, a character in The Dukes of Hazzard
Jeff Davis (disambiguation)